Caelum Vatnsdal (born 1970) is a Canadian writer and filmmaker. He is most noted for his books They Came From Within: A History of Canadian Horror Cinema (2004), a comprehensive study of Canadian horror films, and You Don’t Know Me, But You Love Me: The Lives of Dick Miller (2018), a biography of character actor Dick Miller.

As a filmmaker he directed the feature film Black as Hell, Strong as Death, Sweet as Love (1998) and the Weakerthans documentary film We're the Weakerthans, We're from Winnipeg (2010), as well as numerous short films. He has also acted in the films of Guy Maddin, including Careful, Odilon Redon, or The Eye Like a Strange Balloon Mounts Toward Infinity, Sissy Boy Slap Party, Maldoror: Tygers, The Heart of the World and Cowards Bend the Knee.

He worked from 2008 to 2010 as editor of the Icelandic Canadian community newspaper Lögberg-Heimskringla.

References

External links

1970 births
20th-century Canadian male actors
20th-century Canadian male writers
20th-century Canadian non-fiction writers
20th-century Canadian screenwriters
21st-century Canadian male actors
21st-century Canadian male writers
21st-century Canadian non-fiction writers
21st-century Canadian screenwriters
Canadian male non-fiction writers
Canadian film historians
Canadian biographers
Canadian people of Icelandic descent
Canadian male film actors
Canadian documentary film directors
Film directors from Winnipeg
Male actors from Winnipeg
Writers from Winnipeg
Living people